UEFA Group C of the 2023 FIFA Women's World Cup qualification competition consists of five teams: Netherlands, Iceland, Czech Republic, Belarus, and Cyprus. The composition of the nine groups in the qualifying group stage was decided by the draw held on 30 April 2021, with the teams seeded according to their coefficient ranking.

The group is played in home-and-away round-robin format between 17 September 2021 and 6 September 2022, with a pause for the Women's Euro 2022 in July. The group winners qualify for the final tournament, while the runners-up advance to the play-offs second round if they are one of the three best runners-up among all nine groups (counting results against the fifth-placed team).

Due to the Belarus' involvement in the Russian invasion of Ukraine, the country is required to play its home matches at neutral venues behind closed doors until further notice. The Dutch Football Association has announced that the representative teams of the Netherlands will not play against national teams of Russia and Belarus until further notice. However on 6 May 2022, they announced the Netherlands would play the match against Belarus behind closed doors on 28 June 2022.

Standings

Matches
Times are CET/CEST, as listed by UEFA (local times, if different, are in parentheses).

Goalscorers

Notes

References

External links
FIFA Women's World Cup, UEFA.com

Group C